Papyrus 74 (in the Gregory-Aland numbering), designated by 𝔓74, is a copy of the New Testament in Greek. It is a papyrus manuscript of the Acts of the Apostles and Catholic epistles with lacunae. The manuscript paleographically had been assigned to the 7th century.

Description 
 Contents
The surviving texts are verses:
Acts 1:2–28:31 †; James 1:1–5:20 †; 1 Peter 1:1–2, 7–8, 13, 19–20, 25; 2:6–7, 11–12, 18, 24; 3:4–5; 2 Peter 2:21; 3:4, 11, 16; 1 John 1:1, 6; 2:1–2, 7, 13–14, 18–19, 25–26; 3:1–2, 8, 14, 19–20; 4:1, 6–7, 12, 18–19; 5:3–4, 9–10, 17; 2 John 1, 6–7, 13; 3 John 6, 12; Jude 3, 7, 11–12, 16, 24.

 Text
Despite the late date, it is an important manuscript and excellent witness for the book of Acts.

The Greek text of this codex is a representative of the Alexandrian text-type. Aland ascribed it as a "strict text", and placed it in Category I.

 Acts 12:25 it reads εξ Ιερουσαλημ (from Jerusalem) along with A, 33, 69, 630, 2127; majority reads εις Ιερουσαλημ (to Jerusalem);

 It does not contain Acts 15:34 as codices Sinaiticus, Alexandrinus, Vaticanus, E, Ψ, Byz.

 Acts 20:28 it reads του κυριου (of the Lord) – A C* D E Ψ 33 36 453 945 1739 1891, instead of the Alexandrian του Θεου (of the God), or the Eastern Roman (Byzantine) του κυριου και του Θεου (of the Lord and God).
 Acts 27:16 – καυδα (name of island), this reading is supported only by Vaticanus, 1175, Old-Latin version, Vulgate, and Peshitta.

 Present location
It is currently housed at the Bibliotheca Bodmeriana (P. Bodmer XVII) in Cologny.

See also 

 List of New Testament papyri
 Bodmer Papyri

References

Further reading 

 Rudolf Kasser, Papyrus Bodmer XVII: Actes des Apôtres, Epîtres de Jacques, Pierre, Jean et Jude (Cologny/Geneva: 1961).

External links 

 Robert B. Waltz. NT Manuscripts: Papyri, Papyri 𝔓74.

New Testament papyri
7th-century biblical manuscripts
Acts of the Apostles papyri
Epistle of James papyri
First Epistle of Peter papyri
Second Epistle of Peter papyri
First Epistle of John papyri
Second Epistle of John papyri
Third Epistle of John papyri
Epistle of Jude papyri